Anna Kuulei Furtado Kahanamoku (September 28, 1911 - March 28, 1969) was a Hawaiian teacher who became an elected member of the Hawaii Territorial House of Representatives from the Fourth District, and after Hawaii was admitted to statehood, she served in the Hawaii Senate.

Early life

She was born September 28, 1911, to Antonio Furtado and Lucy Furtado in Lahaina, Maui. Her ancestry was Portuguese, Chinese and Hawaiian. Anna's early education was at Kamehameha Schools.  She matriculated at University of California, Santa Barbara, earning a BA before returning home to pursue graduate work at the University of Hawaii.

Career

Before accepting a teaching position at a junior high school in Hoolehua, Molokai, she worked at Palama Settlement in the Kalihi area. Following her two-year stint on Molokai, she then taught for 15 years at Washington Intermediate School in Honolulu.

In 1950, she left teaching to accept an appointment as sales representative for Pan American World Airways.

Elected to the Territorial House of Representatives 1954-1958, she did so to get more funds and services allocated for education, and was chairman of the Education Committee 1956-1958.  Following the 1959 Hawaii Admission Act, the territory became the 50th state in the union. At the end of her service as a territorial representative, she was employed as an executive with Pan American World Airways in 1960. She was elected to the state Board of Education in 1961, becoming its chairman in 1963.  Anna was elected to the Hawaii State Senate in 1964, serving as chairman of Public Employment Committee, and as a member of Education Ways and Means Committee.

Personal life
She was married to athlete Sargent Kahanamoku, brother of Duke Kahanamoku.  They were both active in local theatre productions. In 1961, they were King and Queen of Aloha Week.

Anna was 1968 residential drive chairman for the American Cancer Society, and was active on several local boards and charities.  She died at home on March 28, 1969.  A thousand people attended a memorial for her held at Kawaiahaʻo Church in Honolulu, where Rev. Abraham Akaka eulogized her as, "a racial rainbow of colors imbued and accepted in one person."

References

1911 births
1969 deaths
Hawaii state senators
Members of the Hawaii Territorial Legislature
Women territorial legislators in Hawaii
Women state legislators in Hawaii
People of the Territory of Hawaii
Native Hawaiian people
American people of Chinese descent
American people of Portuguese descent
20th-century American politicians
Native Hawaiian women in politics
20th-century American women politicians
Asian-American people in Hawaii politics